South Sudan participated at the 2018 Summer Youth Olympics in Buenos Aires, Argentina from 6 October to 18 October 2018.

Competitors

Athletics

Track and road events

Taekwondo

References

2018 in South Sudanese sport
Nations at the 2018 Summer Youth Olympics
South Sudan at the Youth Olympics